Philip Pujan Jalalpoor (born 14 June 1993) is an Iranian German professional basketball player who last played for Úrvalsdeild karla club Njarðvík. He also played for Iran men's national basketball team at the 2020 Summer Olympics.

Professional career
Before Jalalpoor moved to Germany, he played professionally in Spain and Austria. In National play he represented Iran in the 2020 Summer Olympics. 

In August 2022, Jalapoor signed with Úrvalsdeild karla club Njarðvík. He played one regular season game for the team before being released by the club on 13 October. Five days later, he signed a one month contract with rival Úrvalsdeild club KR. In three games for KR, he averaged 8.7 points and 1.3 assists per game.

References

External links
Basketball Bundesliga profile 
Profile at Eurobasket.com
Profile at RealGM.com
Icelandic statistics at Icelandic Basketball Association

1993 births
Living people
Basketball players at the 2020 Summer Olympics
German expatriate sportspeople in Austria
German expatriate sportspeople in Canada
German expatriate sportspeople in Iceland
German expatriate basketball people in Spain
German expatriate basketball people in the United States
German men's basketball players
German people of Iranian descent
Medi Bayreuth players
Njarðvík men's basketball players
Olympic basketball players of Iran
People from Rhein-Pfalz-Kreis
Point guards
Sportspeople of Iranian descent
Sportspeople from Rhineland-Palatinate
UBC Thunderbirds basketball players
Úrvalsdeild karla (basketball) players